Jimmy O'Connell may refer to:

 Jimmy O'Connell (baseball) (1901–1976), outfielder in Major League Baseball
 Jimmy O'Connell (hurler) (1908–?), Irish hurler

See also
 James Connell (disambiguation)
 James O'Connell (disambiguation)